Sagua la Grande River is a river of northern Cuba that flows in Villa Clara Province. It is the second longest river in Cuba, and is one of two navigable rivers along with Cauto River. The mouth is located at Isabela de Sagua, in the municipality of Sagua la Grande.

See also
Sagua la Chica River
List of rivers of Cuba

References
The Columbia Gazetteer of North America. 2000.

Rivers of Cuba
River
Geography of Villa Clara Province